is a broad term for Japanese export porcelain mostly destined for export to Europe and the West, which was shipped out of Yokohama.

Yokohama ware is difficult to define, but encompasses styles such as Arita ware and Satsuma ware that were destined for export. One of the companies specialising in it is Masuda Arts.

References

External links 

 http://hamarepo.com/story.php?story_id=2095

Culture in Yokohama
Japanese pottery